Stan Wild (born 19 February 1944) is a British gymnast. He competed at the 1968 Summer Olympics and the 1972 Summer Olympics.

References

External links
 
 British Men's Artistic Gymnastics Champions - Gymnastics History 

1944 births
Living people
British male artistic gymnasts
Olympic gymnasts of Great Britain
Gymnasts at the 1968 Summer Olympics
Gymnasts at the 1972 Summer Olympics
People from Bolton upon Dearne
British national champions
Gymnastics coaches
Alumni of York St John University